Roland Mundi (born 9 August 1988, in Vác) is a professional Hungarian footballer currently plays for Mosonmagyaróvári TE.

External links
 HLSZ 
 

1988 births
Living people
People from Vác
Hungarian footballers
Association football midfielders
Vasas SC players
Soroksári TE footballers
Szolnoki MÁV FC footballers
Mosonmagyaróvári TE 1904 footballers
FC Dabas footballers
Dunaújváros PASE players
Nemzeti Bajnokság I players
Nemzeti Bajnokság II players
Sportspeople from Pest County